Roan Allen (1904–1930) was one of the founding sires of the Tennessee Walking Horse. It is believed that all Tennessee Walking Horses alive today trace back to him.

Life

Roan Allen was born May 23, 1904, on the farm of James Brantley in Coffee County, Tennessee. He was sired by Black Allan, the stallion who would later be given the designation Allan F-1, and out of the mare Gertrude. Roan Allen was a red roan stallion with a blaze, front socks, and high hind stockings. He was noted for his good conformation. Brantley observed him performing a true running walk within a few hours of his birth. When Roan Allen was three years old, he was put in training with Charlie Ashley of Manchester, Tennessee. Ashley trained Roan Allen to perform seven distinct gaits on command, including the running walk, flat walk, fox trot, true trot and rack. When Roan Allen was fully trained, he was competed successfully in Walking Horse, five-gaited, and harness classes in county fairs.

Roan Allen died in 1930, under rather unusual circumstances. Brantley had loaned him to a farmer named Wallace in McMinnville for breeding purposes. While at the Wallace farm, Roan Allen was kicked by a mare and suffered a broken leg. The injury did not respond to treatment, and the stallion had to be euthanized. James Brantley insisted on putting Roan Allen down himself, even though several others offered to perform the duty.

Influence

Roan Allen was given the designation F-38 when the Tennessee Walking Horse Breeders' and Exhibitors' Association was formed in 1935, five years after his death. It is estimated that 100% of living Tennessee Walking Horses trace their lineage back to Roan Allen. Roan Allen sired 470 registered foals, including the foundation horses Mitch F-5, Sallie F-45, and Hiles Allen F-72. One of his sons, Wilson's Allen, sired five of the early World Grand Champions, including Strolling Jim and Midnight Sun.

Pedigree

References

Individual Tennessee Walking Horses
1904 animal births